This is a list of notable restaurants in Taiwan. In 2018 there were 116,311 restaurants in Taiwan.

Restaurants

Coffee houses, tea houses, and bakeries

Fast food chains

References 
 

 
	

Taiwan